Saddle Island is an island nearly  long, consisting of twin summits which are almost separated by a narrow channel strewn with boulders, lying  north of the west end of Laurie Island in the South Orkney Islands. It was discovered and charted in 1823 by British sealer James Weddell, and named by him for its peculiar shape.

See also 
 Composite Antarctic Gazetteer
 List of Antarctic and sub-Antarctic islands
 List of Antarctic islands south of 60° S
 SCAR
 Territorial claims in Antarctica

References

External links 

Islands of the South Orkney Islands